The 40s decade ran from January 1, AD 40, to December 31, AD 49.

Claudius became Roman Emperor in 41, following the assassination of Caligula. In 43, he sent Aulus Plautius with four legions to Britain (Britannia), initiating the decades-long Roman conquest of Britain. In China, The Trưng sisters' rebellion took place in the south of Han China between 40 AD and 43 AD: In 40 AD, the Vietnamese leader Trưng Trắc and her sister Trưng Nhị rebelled against Chinese authorities in Jiaozhi (in what is now northern Vietnam). In 42 AD, Han China dispatched General Ma Yuan to lead an army to strike down the Yue rebellion of the Trưng sisters. In 43 AD, the Han army fully suppressed the uprising and regained complete control.

Christianity came to Egypt as the Church of Alexandria was founded with Mark the Evangelist as the first Patriarch. James the Great died in 44: One of the Twelve Apostles of Jesus, he was the first to be martyred according to the New Testament. Claudius expelled the Jews from Rome between 41 and 53: Silvia Cappelletti describes Claudius's motivation as the need to control the population of Rome and prevent political meetings. (He "did not have an anti-Jewish policy.") Donna Hurley explains that Suetonius includes the expulsion "among problems with foreign populations, not among religions"

Between 44 and 48, a famine took place in Judea. Josephus relates that Helena of Adiabene "went down to the city Jerusalem, her son conducting her on her journey a great way. Now her coming was of very great advantage to the people of Jerusalem; for whereas a famine did oppress them at that time, and many people died for want of what was necessary to procure food withal, queen Helena sent some of her servants to Alexandria with money to buy a great quantity of corn, and others of them to Cyprus, to bring a cargo of dried figs. And as soon as they were come back, and had brought those provisions, which was done very quickly, she distributed food to those that were in want of it, and left a most excellent memorial behind her of this benefaction, which she bestowed on our whole nation. And when her son Izates was informed of this famine, he sent great sums of money to the principal men in Jerusalem."

Literary works of this decade include the Histories of Alexander the Great (written by Quintus Curtius Rufus), and essays by Seneca (including De Ira, Ad Marciam, De consolatione, De Brevitate Vitæ, De Consolatione ad Polybium, and Ad Helviam matrem, De consolatione).

Manning (2008) tentatively estimates the world population in AD 40 as 247 million.

Demographics 

Due to lack of reliable demographic data, estimates of the world population in the 1st century vary wildly, with estimates for AD 1 varying from 150 to 300 million. Demographers typically do not attempt to estimate most specific years in antiquity, instead giving approximate numbers for round years such as AD 1 or AD 200. However, attempts at reconstructing the world population in more specific years have been made, with Manning (2008) tentatively estimating the world population in AD 40 as 247 million.

Significant people
 Gaius Caesar Germanicus/Caligula (AD 37–41).
 Claudius, Roman Emperor (AD 41–54).
 Agrippina the Younger, Empress Roman and Real Power behind the throne (AD 49–54)
 Paul of Tarsus, Christian evangelist

References